David Williamson Carroll (March 11, 1816 – June 24, 1905) was an American politician who served in the Confederate army and congress during the American Civil War.

Biography
Carroll was born in Baltimore, Maryland. He was a lineal descendant of Daniel Carroll and studied at St. Mary's College of Baltimore. He moved to Arkansas in 1836 and established a legal practice. He married Melanie Scull on February 11, 1838. In 1850, he was elected to the Arkansas state legislature.

During the American Civil War, he enlisted in Company K, 18th Arkansas Infantry with the rank of captain. He rose to become the colonel of the regiment. Later, he represented Arkansas in the Confederate congress.

After the war, he served a state court judge from 1866 to 1868. He died at his home in Little Rock, Arkansas, and was buried in that city's Calvary Cemetery.

References

1816 births
1905 deaths
Members of the Confederate House of Representatives from Arkansas
19th-century American politicians
Politicians from Baltimore
Politicians from Little Rock, Arkansas
Confederate States Army officers
Members of the Arkansas House of Representatives
Arkansas lawyers
St. Mary's Seminary and University alumni
David
Lawyers from Little Rock, Arkansas
Military personnel from Little Rock, Arkansas